Sun City Festival is an age-restricted master-planned community in Maricopa County, Arizona, located within the city boundary of northern Buckeye, Arizona. It is approximately 10 miles west of Surprise, Arizona developed by PulteGroup.

References

External links 
  Sun City Festival Homeowners Association

Retirement communities